The Union of Catholic Asian News (UCAN) is a news agency that covers issues and matters of interest for the Catholic Church on the Asian continent. It was launched in Hong Kong in 1979. Since its foundation, it has become one of the largest Catholic news agencies in the world, as well as the largest in Asia.

A principal goal of UCAN's reporting is to bring the lives and experiences of Asian Catholics to their brothers and sisters in the United States, Europe and elsewhere. UCAN currently operates bureaus in Bangladesh, China, East Timor, Hong Kong, India, Indonesia, South Korea, Myanmar, Nepal, Pakistan, the Philippines, Sri Lanka, and Vietnam.  

UCAN operates foreign language sites in China, Indonesia, South Korea and Vietnam. It also operates two sites that offer local and international English language content in India and the Philippines. It hosts a Catholic directory for some Asian countries where readers can get detailed information on the local dioceses.

References

External links
 

News agencies based in Hong Kong
1979 establishments in Hong Kong
Catholic media